The Sublime Porte, also known as the Ottoman Porte or High Porte ( or Babıali, from  and ,), was a synecdoche for the central government of the Ottoman Empire in Istanbul.

History
The name has its origins in the old practice in which the ruler announced his official decisions and judgements at the gate of his palace. This was the practice in the Byzantine Empire and it was also adopted  by Ottoman Turk sultans since Orhan I, and therefore the palace of the sultan, or the gate leading to it, became known as the "High Gate". This name referred first to a palace in Bursa, Turkey. After the Ottomans had conquered Constantinople, now Istanbul, the gate now known as the Imperial Gate, leading to the outermost courtyard of the Topkapı Palace, first became known as the "High Gate", or the "Sublime Porte".

When Sultan Suleiman the Magnificent sealed an alliance with King Francis I of France in 1536, the French diplomats walked through the monumental gate then known as Bab-ı Ali (now Bâb-ı Hümâyûn) in order to reach the Vizierate of Constantinople, seat of the Sultan's government. French being the language of diplomacy, the French translation Sublime Porte was soon adopted in most other European languages, including English, to refer not only to the actual gate but as a metonymy for the Ottoman Empire.

In the 18th century, a new great Italian-styled office building was built just west of Topkapi Palace area, on the other side of Alemdar Caddesi (Alemdar street). This became the location of the Grand Vizier and many ministries. Thereafter, this building, and the monumental gate leading to its courtyards, became known as the Sublime Porte (Bab-ı Ali); colloquially it was also known as the Gate of the Pasha (paşa kapusu). The building was badly damaged by fire in 1911. Today, the buildings house the Istanbul Governor's Office.

Diplomacy
"Sublime Porte" was used in the context of diplomacy by Western states, as their diplomats were received at the porte (meaning "gate"). During the Second Constitutional Era of the Empire after 1908 (see Young Turk Revolution), the functions of the classical Divan-ı Hümayun were replaced by the reformed Imperial Government, and "porte" came to refer to the Foreign Ministry. During this period, the office of the Grand Vizier came to refer to the equivalent to that of a prime minister, and viziers became members of the Grand Vizier's cabinet as government ministers.

See also
 Bab (disambiguation)
 Raid on the Sublime Porte
 Court of St James's, another synecdochic term, for the United Kingdom in diplomatic relations
 Kremlin, synecdochic term for the Russian government

References

Gates
Government of the Ottoman Empire
1911 fires in Europe
History of Istanbul